McIntyre House, McIntyre Farm or McIntyre Building or variations, may refer to:

McIntyre House (Salt Lake City, Utah), listed on the National Register of Historic Places (NRHP) in Salt Lake City, Utah
McIntyre House (Logan, Arkansas), listed on the NRHP in Benton County, Arkansas
J. McIntyre Farm, Newark, Delaware, NRHP-listed
Bradlee-McIntyre House, Longwood, Florida, NRHP-listed
McIntyre-Burri House, Saint Joseph, Missouri, listed on the NRHP in Buchanan County, Missouri
McIntyre Building, Salt Lake City, Utah, listed on the NRHP in Salt Lake City, Utah